The XVI Army Corps / XVI AK was a corps level command of the German Army before and during World War I.

It was assigned to the VII Army Inspectorate, which became the 5th Army at the start of the First World War. It was still in existence at the end of the war in the 3rd Army, Heeresgruppe Deutscher Kronprinz on the Western Front.

Formation 

By a law of 27 January 1890, it was decided to separate Alsace-Lorraine provinces in military affairs. It stipulated that from 1 April 1890 the entire power of the Army of the German Empire should be twenty army corps (Guards, I - XVII, I and II Bavarian). The All-highest Cabinet Order (Allerhöchste Kabinettsorder, AKO) of 1 February 1890 authorised the formation of the XVI and XVII Army Corps.

The XVI Army Corps was set up on 1 April 1890 in Metz as the Generalkommando (headquarters) for Lorraine. Its headquarters was in the fortress of Metz. It took command of 33rd Division (formerly 30th Division of XV Corps) and 34th Division formed on the same date. It was assigned to the VII Army Inspectorate but joined the 5th Army at the start of the First World War.

Peacetime organisation 
The 25 peacetime Corps of the German Army (Guards, I - XXI, I - III Bavarian) had a reasonably standardised organisation. Each consisted of two divisions with usually two infantry brigades, one field artillery brigade and a cavalry brigade each. Each brigade normally consisted of two regiments of the appropriate type, so each Corps normally commanded 8 infantry, 4 field artillery and 4 cavalry regiments. There were exceptions to this rule:
V, VI, VII, IX and XIV Corps each had a 5th infantry brigade (so 10 infantry regiments)
II, XIII, XVIII and XXI Corps had a 9th infantry regiment
I, VI and XVI Corps had a 3rd cavalry brigade (so 6 cavalry regiments)
the Guards Corps had 11 infantry regiments (in 5 brigades) and 8 cavalry regiments (in 4 brigades).
Each Corps also directly controlled a number of other units. This could include one or more
Foot Artillery Regiment
Jäger Battalion
Pioneer Battalion
Train Battalion

World War I

Organisation on mobilisation 
On mobilization on 2 August 1914 the Corps was restructured.  33rd and 45th Cavalry Brigades were withdrawn to form part of the 6th Cavalry Division and the 34th Cavalry Brigade was broken up and its regiments assigned to the divisions as reconnaissance units.  Divisions received engineer companies and other support units from the Corps headquarters. In summary, XVI Corps mobilised with 24 infantry battalions, 8 machine gun companies (48 machine guns), 8 cavalry squadrons, 24 field artillery batteries (144 guns), 4 heavy artillery batteries (16 guns), 3 pioneer companies and an aviation detachment.

Combat chronicle 
At the outbreak of World War I, the Corps was assigned to the 5th Army. It fought on the Western Front in Lorraine. It was still in existence at the end of the war in the 3rd Army, Heeresgruppe Deutscher Kronprinz on the Western Front.

Commanders 
The XVI Corps had the following commanders during its existence:

See also 

German Army order of battle (1914)
German Army order of battle, Western Front (1918)
List of Imperial German infantry regiments
List of Imperial German artillery regiments
List of Imperial German cavalry regiments

References

Bibliography 
 
 
 
 
 

Corps of Germany in World War I
Military units and formations established in 1890
Military units and formations disestablished in 1919